Jim Desmond is an American politician, businessman, and pilot who serves as a member of the San Diego County Board of Supervisors from the fifth district. He previously served as the mayor of San Marcos, California from 2006 to 2014. He is a Republican.

Education 
Desmond earned a bachelor's degree in electrical engineering from San Diego State University. He later completed the Leadership North County program at California State University San Marcos.

Career 
After college, he founded Technical Standards, Inc. a technical writing company.

Desmond was elected mayor in 2006 and re-elected in 2010 and 2014 without opposition. A veteran of the United States Navy, Desmond served as mayor while concurrently working as a pilot for Delta Air Lines.  In 2018, he was elected to the San Diego County Board of Supervisors.

Desmond has denied the scientific consensus on climate change. He was criticized for his response to the COVID-19 pandemic, referring to only a fraction of the COVID deaths as "pure".  He has also supported Donald Trump, in his lawsuits to overturn California state laws. Desmond is an opponent of public transit investment, and opposes any transportation investment plan that does not include 14 highway projects.

Personal life 
Desmond moved to San Diego when he joined the Navy in 1984. He is married and has two children. As of 2022, Desmond and his wife reside in Oceanside, California in North San Diego County.

References

External links 
 Supervisor Jim Desmond at San Diego County

Living people
Mayors of places in California
People from San Marcos, California
San Diego County Board of Supervisors members
United States Navy sailors
Year of birth missing (living people)
Place of birth missing (living people)
21st-century American politicians